Reporting to Mr Usman Gul.

Dear Usman Mari is a village in the Khyber Pakhtunkhwa Province of Pakistan. It is located at 33°57'0N 73°18'0E with an altitude of 1341 metres (4402 feet).

References

Villages in Khyber Pakhtunkhwa